The 2006 ADAC Procar Series season was the twelfth season of the ADAC Procar Series, the German championship for Super 2000 cars. The season consisted of eight separate race weekends with two races each, spread over five different tracks. The championship was won by ex-BTCC driver Vincent Radermecker from Belgium.

Teams and drivers

Race calendar and results

Championship standings

References

External links
 Official ADAC Procar Series website

ADAC Procar Series
ADAC Procar Series seasons